This is a list of combatant ship classes of the Japan Maritime Self-Defense Force.

DDH : Destroyer Helicopter
  (1973–2011)
  (1980–2017)
  (2006-present)
  (2015-present)

DDG : Guided Missile Destroyer
  (DDG-163) (1965–1995)
  (1976–2010)
  (1986-present)
  (1993-present)
  (2007-present)
  (2020-present)

DD : Destroyer
  - former USN destroyers supplied under Mutual Defense Assistance (1954-1970)
 , formerly 
 , formerly 
  - ex-USN (1959-1974)
 , formerly 
 , formerly 
  (1956-1985)
 Akizuki class (1960-1993)
  (1982-2021)
  (1986–present)
 Murasame class (1996-present)
  (2003–present)
 Akizuki class (2012-present)
  (2018-present)

DDA : All Purpose Destroyer
 Murasame class (1958–1989)
  (1967–2003)

DDK : Anti Submarine Destroyer
  (1958–1990)
  (1966–2005)
  (1967–2000)

DE : Destroyer Escort
  (1955-1975)
 , formerly 
 , formerly 
  (1956-1976)
  (1956-1977)
  (1956-1971), former Imperial Japanese Navy ship Nashi
  (1961-1993)
  (1971-2003)
  (1981-2007)
  (1983-2010)
  (1989-present)

FFM : Frigate Multi-Purpose/Mine
  (2022-present)

PF : Patrol Frigate
  (1951-1976)

PG : Guided Missile Patrol Boat
  (1993-2010)
  (2002-present)

SS : Submarine
  (1955-1966), formerly 
  (1960-1976)
  (1962-1979)
  (1963-1980)
  (1965-1981)
  (1966-1986)
  (1971-1996)
  (1980-2008)
  (1990-2017)
  (1998-present)
  (2009-present)
  (2022-present)

LST : Tank Landing Ship
  (1972-2005)
  (1975-2002)
  (1998-present)

LSU : Landing Ship Utility

LCU : Landing Craft Utility
  (1988-present)

LSSL : Patrol Boats 

 Yuri class

See also
 List of active ships of the Japan Maritime Self-Defense Force

Maritime Self-Defense Force
 
Maritime Self-Defense Force